Ivan Zachariáš (born 19 October 1971 in Praha) is a Czech film director, who has made commercials for Stella Artois, Land Rover, Volvo and Adidas.

Biography
Zachariáš studied film at the Film and TV School of the Academy of Performing Arts in Prague (FAMU). He was a student at the school during the Velvet Revolution, and began directing commercials and music videos for the new advertising agencies and production companies which were being established. During his career, his work has won the Golden Lion six times at the Cannes Lions International Festival of Creativity. The Museum of Modern Art in New York acquired his short film Mulit as part of the Association of Independent Commercial Producers awards showcase in 2007. In 2014, Zachariáš directed Jeff Bridges reprising his role of "The Dude" from The Big Lebowski for a Kahlua advertisement. He is represented as a commercial director by the production company Smuggler.

In 2016, Zachariáš made his television debut with the crime drama Wasteland for HBO Europe, which won the Czech Lion for best drama series.

In 2019, he directed HBO's The Sleepers, a spy thriller about the Velvet Revolution.

References

External links 

 

Living people
1971 births
Film directors from Prague
Advertising directors